The Voice Česko Slovensko (Czech and Slovak for The Czech / Slovak Voice, literally The Voice of Czecho Slovakia, previously Hlas Česko Slovenska) is a reality singing competition and version of The Voice of Holland for Czech Republic and Slovakia. It is broadcast on TV Nova in Czech Republic and TV Markíza in Slovakia, both stations are owned by CME. It is derived from the original The Voice of Holland. The concept of the competition consists of searching for singer talents (from the second row and duets) over 16 years of age in public casting. The winner is later determined on the basis of a voting vote by SMS, which receives financial rewards and the ability to upload his own album.

As Czech and Slovak are very similar, it is a bilingual show. People from Czech Republic are speaking the Czech language when people from Slovakia are speaking the Slovak language. Czechs and Slovaks in this show are communicating jointly without language change. People from all other countries are communicating in English or its native language, with assistance of a translator.

The Voice was first introduced to viewers in Czech Republic and Slovakia on February 12, 2012, when 1,119 million viewers watched it on average. In the competition, the coaches choose their competitors only according to their voice, who then compete against each other. Not only competitors but also coaches compete because the coach just wants to be what Voice shows. The first coaches were Dara Rolins, Michal David, Josef Vojtek and Rytmus. The show is moderated by Leoš Mareš and Tina. This season was won by Slovak Ivanna Bagová.

On November 19, 2013, it was announced that Voice returned to the second season, which began broadcast on March 5, 2014, and ended June 18, 2014 with the victory of Lenka Hrůzová. He also recently appeared in Sunday's slot, not Sunday, as he has done so far. This season was won by Czech Lenka Hrůzová.

On June 15, 2018, TV Nova announced on its Facebook site that the third line was being produced under the English name The Voice Czech Republic. At the same time, the castings were announced in a new season, where participants can sign up using the Nova and Markíza websites. Eventually, the name The Voice Česko Slovensko was adopted. This season was won by Annamária D’Almeida, a Slovak of Benin origin.

As of February 2023, a fourth season has yet to be announced.

Format

Each year begins with "Blind Selections," where coaches compose their team of singers (14 in the first year, 12 in the second) with whom they will work during the competition. The coach is facing the back of the contestant in the chair, if the coach likes the show, he presses the "I want you" button and the chair immediately turns towards the contestant with the shining sign I want you to. After being cheered, the competitor is automatically assigned to the team of the coach who chose him. If more coaches have turned, the singer chooses himself to which team he will go.

The next part of the competition is "duels." Each coach will form in his team two couples who will compete in a duel and sing one common song. The coach then decides whom to keep in his team. In the first year, the coaches invited their mentor to help them in their decisions (Linda Fink, Vašo Patejdl, Tonya Graves and Tomi Popovič). Since the second year, a new element of theft has been introduced, when a disqualified competitor could take another coach to the team and save him from falling out.

The new part from the second row is "K.O." Team contestants are here again divided into pairs, but each singers sing their song. The coach decides who else to send and who will end up in the competition.

At the final stage of the Live Transmission Competition, the singers sing other songs each week, and the competitor leaves the contest for a week until the winner of the contest is announced. Their audience decides about their fate using SMS votes. The competition leaves the contestants with the smallest number of votes from each team. In the first year each week was dedicated to only two teams separately, so after 14 days each competitor left each competition from each team. Fourteen days before the final, each team participated each week. Progress was made by the competitor with the highest number of points he could get by the number of votes and points from the coach. In each team, the number of votes cast by the spectators was converted to a percentage, and then the points were scored by the coach who had a total of 100 and had to divide them between two contestants from his team. In the second year, this principle was no longer used, with four teams playing every week, and only viewers were taking their decision.

Coaches and hosts

Presenters

Coaches' teams

Color key:
 – Winning
 – Runner-Up
 – Third place
 – Fourth place

Series overview
Colour key

 Team Pepa
 Team Dara
 Team Rytmus
 Team Michal
 Team Dara & Marta
 Team Majk
 Team Vojtěch
 Team Jana
 Team Kali

See also
The Voice (TV series)

References

External links
Hlas Česko Slovenska Official Czech website
Hlas Česko Slovenska Official Slovak website

Czech Slovak
2012 Czech television series debuts
2012 Czech television series endings
Slovak reality television series
Czech reality television series
2012 Slovak television series debuts
2012 Slovak television series endings
2010s Slovak television series
2010s Czech television series
TV Nova (Czech TV channel) original programming
Markíza original programming